"Whistle Down the Wind" is the debut solo single by English musician Nick Heyward, from his debut solo album North of a Miracle. Released in March 1983, it was his first release after leaving Haircut One Hundred. The song peaked at No. 13 on the UK Singles Chart, as well as reaching No. 20 on the U.S. Billboard Adult Contemporary chart in February 1984.

References

1983 songs
1983 debut singles
Nick Heyward songs
Songs written by Nick Heyward
Song recordings produced by Geoff Emerick
Arista Records singles